Moonshine Valley is a 1922 American silent Western film. Its working title was The Miracle Child: He Giveth and Taketh. It is not known whether the film currently survives, and may be a lost film.

Plot
The plot centers around a man named Ned Connors who begins to drink heavily because his wife has left him for the local doctor. The man discovers a lost child and takes her in. The child soon becomes ill and the doctor is called for. Upon arriving, the doctor recognizes the girl as his own. When the doctor tries to take the girl away, Ned murders him. The film concludes with Ned and his wife reuniting in order to take care of the now orphaned child.

Cast
 William Farnum as Ned Connors
 Sadie Mullen as Mrs Connors
 Holmes Herbert as Dr. Martin
 Anne Shirley as Nancy (credited as Dawn O'Day)
 Jean Bronte as Jean the Dog

Reception
One film exhibitor called it the "poorest excuse for a picture [he] ever saw."

References

External links

 
 

1922 Western (genre) films
1922 films
Fox Film films
American black-and-white films
Films directed by Herbert Brenon
Silent American Western (genre) films
1920s American films